Kato Dikomo is a village in Cyprus, located about halfway between Nicosia and Kyrenia. De facto, it is under the control of Northern Cyprus. According to Northern Cyprus, Kato Dikomo is part of Dikomo.

Famous locals 
 Dimitris Christofias, former president of Cyprus, born in Kato Dikomo
 Georgios Savvides, AKEL MP 1970–1991, born in Kato Dikomo
 Christodoulos Taramountas, Democratic Rally and European Democracy MP, born in Kato Dikomo

References 

Communities in Kyrenia District
Populated places in Girne District